HMS K11 was a K class submarine built by Armstrong Whitworth, Newcastle upon Tyne. K11 was laid down in October 1915, and commissioned in February 1917. It had a complement of 59 crew members.

In 1917, K11 was damaged by fire during a North Sea patrol. She was forced to surface and was towed by a destroyer. K11 was part of the disastrous Battle of May Island exercise. She was forced to take avoiding action to avoid , but survived the exercise. K11 was sold on 4 November 1921.

Design
Like all British K-class submarines, K9 had a displacement of  when at the surface and  while submerged. The submarine was powered by two oil-fired Yarrow Shipbuilders boilers and one geared Brown-Curtis or Parsons steam turbine; this developed 10,500 ship horsepower (7,800 kW) to drive two  screws. It also contained four electric motors each producing . It was also fitted with a diesel engine providing  to be used when steam was being raised, or instead of raising steam.

K9 was fitted with a  anti-aircraft gun, ten  torpedo tubes, and two  deck guns. Its torpedo tubes were fitted to the bows, the midship section, and two were mounted on the deck. Its complement was fifty-nine crew members.

References

Bibliography
 

 

British K-class submarines
Ships built on the River Tyne
1916 ships
Ships built by Armstrong Whitworth
Royal Navy ship names